Warren Airport  is a privately owned, public use airport located five nautical miles (6 mi, 9 km) northwest of the central business district of Warren, a city in Trumbull County, Ohio, United States. It is included in the National Plan of Integrated Airport Systems for 2011–2015, which categorized it as a general aviation facility.

Facilities and aircraft 
Warren Airport covers an area of 135 acres (55 ha) at an elevation of 905 feet (276 m) above mean sea level. It has two runways: 4/22 is 2,907 by 30 feet (886 x 9 m) with an asphalt surface and 18/36 is 2,700 by 140 feet (823 x 43 m) with a turf surface.

For the 12-month period ending July 30, 2009, the airport had 14,738 general aviation aircraft operations, an average of 40 per day. At that time there were 39 aircraft based at this airport: 97% single-engine and 3% ultralight.

References

External links 
 Aerial image as of April 1994 from USGS The National Map

Airports in Ohio
Transportation in Trumbull County, Ohio